Nag Nayak was an Indian monarch who lived and reigned from the late 13th century to the early 14th century, achieving the title of Rana. He hailed from Sinhagad, an ancient mountain fortress previously known as Kondhana, located roughly 35km southwest of the city of Pune, India. 

He was a member of the Mahadeo Koli caste. 

Nag Nayak was worshipped as a symbol of strength and held power over the strategically important mountain fortress Sinhagad. It is said that he resisted an eight month attack from the Islamic empire, which stretched over large parts of the Indian subcontinent. Under the orders of Sultan Muhammad bin Tughluq of the Delhi sultanate, the attack raged until Nag Nayak's death in 1328, at which point Tughluq seized the fortress and relative control over the Koli people.

See also 
 List of Koli people
 List of Koli states and clans

References 

Koli people
1328 deaths
Year of birth unknown
 History of Pune
 Indian monarchs
 Delhi Sultanate
14th-century Indian people
 Forts in Maharashtra